The 2014 Ohio gubernatorial election took place on November 4, 2014. Incumbent Republican Governor John Kasich won reelection to a second term in office by a landslide over Democratic candidate Ed FitzGerald and Green Party candidate Anita Rios. Primary elections were held on May 6, 2014.

Despite FitzGerald's massive defeat, he is as of 2018 the last Democrat to carry the historically Democratic Monroe County, which voted for Republican candidate Mike DeWine four years later. Kasich's landslide victory gave him the highest percentage of the vote since George Voinovich's win in 1994, a large improvement from his narrow victory in 2010. , this was the last time the counties of Cuyahoga and Franklin voted for the Republican candidate.

Background
Kasich, who was elected with Tea Party support in 2010, faced considerable backlash from the movement. His decision to accept the Patient Protection and Affordable Care Act's expansion of Medicaid, his increased spending, taxation of fracking on Ohio farmland and perceived failure to go far enough on charter schools and school vouchers caused Tea Party groups to refuse to support his campaign. When Kasich passed over Tea Party leader Tom Zawistowski for the position of Executive Director of the Ohio Republican Party in favor of Matt Borges, who worked with a gay rights group, that was widely seen as the last straw. Tea Party groups announced they would support a primary challenger, or, if none emerged, the Libertarian nominee. Zawistowski said, "John Kasich is going to lose in 2014. We don't care who else wins." Ultimately, Kasich was unopposed in the Republican primary.

Republican primary

Candidates

Declared
 John Kasich, incumbent governor
 Running mate: Mary Taylor, incumbent lieutenant governor

Declined
 Donald Allen, veterinarian and candidate for the U.S. House of Representatives in 2010
 Running mate: Kelly Kohls, education activist and Chair of the Warren County Tea Party
 Ted Stevenot, president of the Ohio Liberty Coalition

Results

Democratic primary

Candidates

Declared
 Larry Ealy, former tow truck operator, former male stripper, perennial candidate and vexatious litigant
Running mate: Ken Gray, nurse
 Ed FitzGerald, County Executive of Cuyahoga County and former mayor of Lakewood
Running mate: Sharen Neuhardt, attorney, nominee for Ohio's 7th congressional district in 2008 and for Ohio's 10th congressional district in 2012

Withdrew
 Todd Portune, Hamilton County Commissioner

Declined
 Michael B. Coleman, Mayor of Columbus
 Richard Cordray, Director of the Consumer Financial Protection Bureau and former Ohio Attorney General
 Tim Ryan, U.S. Representative
 Ted Strickland, former Governor
 Betty Sutton, former U.S. Representative

Results

Green primary

Candidates

Declared
 Anita Rios, nominee for Lieutenant Governor of Ohio in 2006 and 2010 and candidate for the U.S. Senate in 2012
 Running mate: Bob Fitrakis, author and perennial candidate

Disqualified
 Dennis Spisak, perennial candidate (failed to gather enough valid signatures)
 Running mate: Suzanne Patzer, information technology supervisor

Results

Libertarian primary
Charlie Earl gathered enough raw signatures to obtain ballot access. However, he was removed from the ballot because technical faults in collection rendered many of his signatures invalid. The decision was appealed in federal court.

Candidates

Disqualified
 Charlie Earl, former Republican State Representative
 Running mate: Sherry Clark, newspaper publisher

General election

Campaign
FitzGerald released a plan for state-funded universal preschool in addition to announcing his support for gay marriage. He criticized Kasich for signing into law income tax cuts that save larger sums of money for wealthier Ohioans than poorer ones, while increasing sales taxes, which tax a larger percentage of income from poorer Ohioans than from wealthier ones. FitzGerald also chided Kasich for a lack of transparency at JobsOhio, the privatized economic development agency that Kasich formed, and for signing into law bills that cut early voting days and limit the distribution of absentee ballot applications. FitzGerald faced several scandals that damaged his candidacy, most notably the revelations that he had driven for several years without a valid driver's license, him being found in a car late at night with a woman who was not his wife, and that his initial running mate, State Sen. Eric Kearney, owed over $1 million in unpaid taxes. Additionally, FitzGerald consistently trailed Kasich in fundraising throughout the entire campaign.

Endorsements

Predictions

Polling

 ^ Polling for the Ohio Democratic Party

Results

By congressional district
Kasich won 14 of 16 congressional districts, including 2 districts that lean strongly democratic.

References

External links
Ohio gubernatorial election, 2014 at Ballotpedia
Official campaign websites (Archived)
 John Kasich for Governor (R), Incumbent
 Ed FitzGerald for Governor (D)
 Anita Rios for Governor (G)

Gubernatorial
2014
Ohio
John Kasich